Beaumont Hill is a village in the borough of Darlington and the traditional and ceremonial counties of Durham in England, situated directly to the north of Darlington on the A167 road.

References

External links

Villages in County Durham
Places in the Borough of Darlington
Places in the Tees Valley